Various individuals have been called "the Father of Hollywood", including:
Charles E. Toberman
H. J. Whitley